Ocean was a Canadian gospel/soft rock band formed in 1970 in Toronto, Ontario.  They are best known for their 1971 single "Put Your Hand in the Hand", penned by Jeff Jones and Gene MacLellan. The single sold over one million copies, earning a gold disc in the United States from the Recording Industry Association of America, on 3 May 1971.  The single peaked at No. 2 on the U.S. Billboard Hot 100,  and reached No. 4 on the Billboard Adult Contemporary chart.

The song was inducted into the Canadian Songwriters Hall of Fame, in 2006.

Background
Ocean consisted of Greg Brown (vocals, keyboard), Jeff Jones (bass, vocals), Janice Morgan (guitar, vocals), Dave Tamblyn (guitar), and Chuck Slater (drums). Dave Tamblyn had previously been in the group Natural Gas.

Career
They recorded their debut album, Put Your Hand in the Hand, in Toronto in 1970. The album, originally released on the Yorkville label in Canada, contained eight songs written by such notables as Robbie Robertson and Gene MacLellan. The album was picked up in the U.S. by the Kama Sutra label, which also released the band's second album, Give Tomorrow's Children One More Chance, in both the U.S. and Canada.

Ocean managed additional hits in Canada with the songs "We've Got a Dream" and "One More Chance", both written by the British songwriting team of Roger Cook and Roger Greenaway, but they failed to make any further impact in the U.S., and the group disbanded in 1975 after having released two albums.

Later years
Chuck Slater died by his own hand in 1987.

Discography

Albums

Singles

References

External links
[ AllMusic Guide entry for Ocean]
CanadianBands.com entry for Ocean
 

1970 establishments in Ontario
1975 disestablishments in Ontario
Canadian Christian rock groups
Kama Sutra Records artists
Soft rock music groups
Musical groups established in 1970
Musical groups disestablished in 1975
Musical groups from London, Ontario